Rocky Mountain Music is the second studio album by American country music artist Eddie Rabbitt. It was released in 1976 under the Elektra Records label. The album produced three singles: "Drinkin' My Baby (Off My Mind)", which became Rabbitt's first number one hit on the Country charts; the title track, which peaked at number 5 and "Two Dollars in the Jukebox", which reached number 3. The song "I Don't Wanna Make Love (With Anyone But You)" was re-recorded for the album Loveline.

All songs, with the exception of "Could You Love A Poor Boy, Dolly" (penned by Even Stevens) were either written or co-written by Rabbitt. All co-written songs paired Rabbitt with Stevens, with the exception of "Tullahoma Dancing Pizza Man" which was a collaboration of Rabbitt and Chris Gantry.

Track listing

Personnel
Eddie Rabbitt - acoustic guitar, lead vocals, backing vocals
 David Briggs - piano
 Johnny Christopher - acoustic guitar
 Sonny Garrish - steel guitar
 Steve Gibson - electric guitar
 Lea Jane Singers - background vocals
 Shane Keister - piano, synthesizer
 Mike Leech - bass guitar
 Larrie Londin - drums
 Farrell Morris - percussion
 Joe Osborn - bass guitar
 Hargus "Pig" Robbins - piano
 Hal Rugg - steel guitar
 Buddy Spicher - fiddle, violin
 Michael Spriggs - acoustic guitar
 Bobby Thompson - acoustic guitar, banjo
 Pete Wade - acoustic guitar
 Jack Williams - bass guitar
 Reggie Young - electric guitar

Chart positions

Singles

References

1976 albums
Eddie Rabbitt albums
Albums produced by David Malloy
Elektra Records albums